The following people were all born in, residents of, or otherwise closely associated with York, Pennsylvania.

References

 
York, Pennsylvania
York